Wu Yongmei (born 1 January 1975) is a Chinese former volleyball player who competed in the 1996 Summer Olympics and in the 2000 Summer Olympics.

References

1975 births
Living people
Chinese women's volleyball players
Olympic volleyball players of China
Volleyball players at the 1996 Summer Olympics
Volleyball players at the 2000 Summer Olympics
Olympic silver medalists for China
Olympic medalists in volleyball
Asian Games medalists in volleyball
Volleyball players at the 1998 Asian Games
Medalists at the 1996 Summer Olympics
Medalists at the 1998 Asian Games
Asian Games gold medalists for China
21st-century Chinese women